Igor Yudin (born 17 June 1987) is an Australian volleyball player with Russian origins, a member of Australia men's national volleyball team in 2004–2012, a participant of the 2012 Olympic Games, 2007 Asian Champion.

Personal life
Yudin was born in Yekaterinburg, Russia. He moved to Australia with his family, when he was 14. He has a mother called Tatiana, a stepfather called Russel, and a sister called Victoria who live in Australia. His wife, daughter, and son live Poland. Yudin has had a Russian citizenship since 2013. Igor attended Eltham High School.

Career
He was the Australian volleyball captain at the 2012 Olympic Games. In 2013, He has had a Russian citizenship and stopped playing for the Australian national team. In 2016, Yudin started playing for Russia.

Sporting achievements

Clubs

FIVB Club World Championship
  Poland 2017 - with Zenit Kazan

CEV Challenge Cup
  2008/2009 - with Jastrzębski Węgiel

National championships
 2005/2006  Brazilian Championship, with Minas Tênis Clube
 2006/2007  Polish Championship, with Jastrzębski Węgiel
 2008/2009  Polish Championship, with Jastrzębski Węgiel
 2009/2010  Polish Cup, with Jastrzębski Węgiel
 2009/2010  Polish Championship, with Jastrzębski Węgiel
 2017/2018  Russian Championship, with Zenit Kazan

National team
 2007  Asian Championship

References

External links
 PlusLiga player profile

1987 births
Living people
Russian men's volleyball players
Australian men's volleyball players
Volleyball players at the 2012 Summer Olympics
Olympic volleyball players of Australia
Expatriate volleyball players in Poland
Jastrzębski Węgiel players
AZS Olsztyn players
BKS Visła Bydgoszcz players
VC Zenit Kazan players